Billy Seymour (born 1999) is an Irish hurler who plays for Tipperary Senior Championship club Kiladangan and at inter-county level with the Tipperary senior hurling team. He usually lines out as a full-forward.

Honours

Kiladangan
Tipperary Senior Hurling Championship (1): 2020

Tipperary
All-Ireland Under-21 Hurling Championship (1): 2019
Munster Under-20 Hurling Championship (1): 2019

References

1999 births
Living people
Kildangan hurlers (Tipperary)
Tipperary inter-county hurlers